Lachhera (or Lacheda) is a village in Muzaffarnagar Tehsil of Muzaffarnagar District in the Indian state of Uttar Pradesh. It belongs to Saharanpur Division. It is located 8 km south side of District headquarters

Geography
Jaroda (2 km), Seemli (3 km), Garhi Durganpur (3 km), Wahalna (3 km), Mirapur (4 km) and Tawali are villages nearby Lachhera. Lachhera is bordered by Baghara Tehsil towards the west, Shahpur Tehsil towards the west, Khatauli Tehsil towards the south, and Charthawal Tehsil towards the north.

Muzaffarnagar, Sardhana, Thana Bhawan, and Shamli are nearby cities.

References

Villages in Muzaffarnagar district